Rosemary Casals and Judy Dalton were the defending champions but Judy Dalton did not compete this year. Rosemary Casals teamed up with Billie Jean King and lost in semifinals to Françoise Dürr and Betty Stöve.

Françoise Dürr and Betty Stöve won the title by defeating Margaret Court and Virginia Wade 6–3, 1–6, 6–3 in the final.

Seeds

Draw

Finals

Top half

Bottom half

References

External links
1972 US Open – Women's draws and results at the International Tennis Federation

Women's Doubles
US Open (tennis) by year – Women's doubles
1972 in women's tennis
1972 in American women's sports